Nurmakhan Tinaliyev (born January 10, 1988) is a male wrestler from Kazakhstan. He was flag bearer at the 2012 Summer Olympics.

External links
 bio on fila-wrestling.com

Living people
1988 births
Kazakhstani male sport wrestlers
Wrestlers at the 2012 Summer Olympics
Wrestlers at the 2016 Summer Olympics
Olympic wrestlers of Kazakhstan
Asian Games medalists in wrestling
Wrestlers at the 2010 Asian Games
Wrestlers at the 2014 Asian Games
World Wrestling Championships medalists
Asian Games gold medalists for Kazakhstan
Asian Games silver medalists for Kazakhstan
Medalists at the 2010 Asian Games
Medalists at the 2014 Asian Games
Universiade medalists in wrestling
Wrestlers at the 2018 Asian Games
Medalists at the 2018 Asian Games
Universiade bronze medalists for Kazakhstan
Medalists at the 2013 Summer Universiade
Asian Wrestling Championships medalists
21st-century Kazakhstani people